Story of an Unknown Actor  is a Soviet drama film directed by Aleksandr Zarkhi  in 1977.

Plot
Pavel Pavlovich Goryaev, middle-aged actor. For many years, he played in the provincial theater on lead roles. The director of the piece based on the play, written for Goryaev, takes a young actor for his role. Goryaev first falls into despair, leaves the theater, makes an appeal to his friends. After a while, he digests what happened and realizes it's time to leave the scene adequately.

Cast
 Yevgeny Yevstigneyev as Pavel Goryaev
 Alla Demidova as  Olga  Svetilnikova
 Igor Kvasha as  Viktor  Vereshchagin
 Angelina Stepanova as  Maria Goryaeva
 Igor Starygin as  Vadim
 Vladislav Strzhelchik as Mikhail  Tverskoy
 Valentin Gaft as  director   Znamensky
 Mikhail Kononov as Petya Strizhov
 Nikolay Trofimov as Pyotr Fomich
 Pavel Vinnik as  Ferapontov
 Irina Murzaeva as old actress
 Nikolay Smorchkov as actor
 Valentina Telegina as  episode

See also
 Winter Evening in Gagra (1985)

References

External links
 

Mosfilm films
Soviet drama films
1977 drama films
1977 films
Films directed by Aleksandr Zarkhi
Films scored by Alfred Schnittke
Films about actors